Self-righteousness, also called sanctimoniousness, sententiousness and holier-than-thou attitudes is a feeling or display of (usually smug) moral superiority  derived from a sense that one's beliefs, actions, or affiliations are of greater virtue than those of the average person. Self-righteous individuals are often intolerant of the opinions and behaviors of others.

The term "self-righteous" is often considered derogatory (see, for example, journalist and essayist James Fallows' description of self-righteousness in regard to Nobel Peace Prize winners)

See also
Elitism
Mississippi Squirrel Revival
Sanctimommy
Signalling theory
Superiority complex
The Mote and the Beam
The Pharisee and the Publican
Virtue signalling

Further reading
Good Mrs. Hypocrite: A Study in Self-Righteousness

References

Emotions
Self
Morality
Narcissism
Pejorative terms